Roy Raymonde (1929–2009) was a British editorial cartoonist best known for his work in Playboy, Punch and The Sunday Telegraph. He was much admired for his stylish comic drawings and flamboyant use of colour.

Early life

Roy Stuart Raymonde was born in 1929 in Grantham, Lincolnshire to Juliana Patricia Quinn and Barry Raymonde, an advertising agent and theatrical impresario. They were living in Bristol in 1938 when Barry contracted pneumonia and died, leaving Patricia (who was pregnant with her second child, Patsy) to fend for her family. Their life became peripatetic as Patricia took a series of jobs around the country. During this period Raymonde attended at least 16 different schools. They finally settled in North London just in time for the Blitz. He recounted that the Kingsbury house they lived in was completely demolished one night by a German land mine. Fearing that he had been killed, the firemen feverishly cleared the rubble only to find him soundly asleep in his bed, blankets pulled over his head.

At the age of 15 Raymonde attended Harrow School of Art. There he met and was influenced by the yet to become well-known cartoonist Gerard Hoffnung who was at that time a junior tutor. Raymonde told a story of how he was nearly expelled for defacing one of Hoffnung's demonstration drawings by adding funny captions. Hoffnung himself came to his defense and saved his position by arguing that this act in itself demonstrated a certain latent talent. They remained friends until Hoffnung's death in 1959.

On leaving art school Raymonde took a job in a commercial art studio, where he believed that his association with professional illustrators really taught him his drawing skills. At 18 he was called up to do National Service in Malaya, and worked for British Army intelligence in photoreconnaissance.

Career

When demobilised in 1950 he took a Job at Charles Gilbert's advertising agency in Fleet Street and continued there for the next ten years. During this period he also free-lanced as a cartoonist in his spare time and had his work first published in Tit-Bits. He then contributed to Lilliput, The Daily Sketch and drew a regular weekly feature in Drapery and Fashion Weekly called 'Lil'. In 1953 he married Guyanese journalist Patricia Eytle – sister of Ernest Eytle (BBC Cricket Commentator) Tommy Eytle (actor and musician) and Les Eytle (first black Mayor of and Freeman of Lewisham).

By 1960 he had started working for Punch and was busy enough to become a full-time cartoonist. Shortly after this he sold a regular cartoon strip 'Patsy & John' to The Sunday Telegraph and started a long relationship with that newspaper. Other features followed, notably 'Them', 'Boffins at Bay', 'Raymonde's Rancid Rhymes' (when he forayed into the world of comic poetry) and 'Raymonde's Blooming Wonders' – clever character sketches of notable personalities in the guise of a Victorian botanical encyclopedia. In 1966 he won the Cartoonist's Club of Great Britain's Feature Cartoonist of the Year award. He also produced two books of cartoons in the 1960s, The Constant Minx: From the Beginning (1961) and More Constant Minx (1961). They were a cartoonist's view of women's ability to bewitch men.

In 1963 he bought a thatched cottage near Great Dunmow in Essex, where he spent the rest of his life.

During this period Raymonde also had a feature in Mayfair under the editorship of Kenneth Bound. At the same time he started sending cartoon ideas to Playboy. Michelle Urry had just become Hugh Hefner's art editor at Playboy, and was busy assembling an international stable of talented cartoonists. Raymonde's cartoons were accepted, though as far as men's magazines were concerned, on the proviso that he work exclusively for Playboy. From then on he was given a monthly full-colour page for the next 30 years.

His colour cartoons were much admired and he was commissioned to create many Punch covers, a long series of illustrations for Punch's 'Doc Brief' (Robert Buckman's humorous take on the medical world) and regular cartoons for Reader's Digest. Time & Tide magazine also made a short resurgence in the 1990s and he drew covers for it and for British Airways' High Life.

He collaborated with his friend Robert Holles (novelist, playwright and film writer) during this period and illustrated two of his books: The Guide to Real Village Cricket (1983) and The Guide to Real Subversive Soldiering (1985).

Technique

After creating an idea/situation Raymonde's drawings were first sketched out in pencil on watercolour paper and then inked in Indian ink with a steel dip pen.  The colour was applied using sable brushes, from a variety of water-based mediums – watercolour, coloured inks, acrylics or gouache. A great experimenter. he would use whatever came to hand and whatever would give him the effect he was looking for. As with most cartoonists he produced many 'rough ideas', which were either accepted of rejected by various magazine's editors. The accepted 'roughs' were then re-drawn as a final drawings.

His original colour paintings have always been sought after and hang in many public and private collections including the Victoria & Albert Museum, the British Cartoon Archive at the University of Kent, the Simavi Foundation Cartoon Museum (Istanbul), the Ritsumeikan Peace Museum (Kyoto), Kyoto Seika University and the Punch Library.

Influences

Raymonde collected 18c prints and was particularly fond of Rowlandson. Other influences were Gerard Hoffnung, his first teacher, Ronald Searle and he also admired the drawings or André François, Tomi Ungerer, Quentin Blake and Adolf Born.

Far East

In the late 1980s he visited Japan as a part of an Anglo-French cartoonists delegation, which became the start of a long association with the Far East. He was invited back for lecture tours in both Japan and Korea, and then to exhibit at the Marunie Gallery, Kyoto. In 1996 he won Gold Prize at the Kyoto International Cartoon Festival and was asked to return to Japan several times after this as a judge.

Summary

Raymonde was a voracious reader and in particular a lover of poetry. He had assembled a fine collection of antiquarian books. He and his wife had also developed a great passion for Venice and spent almost all of their holidays exploring its sights and communing with their many friends who lived there.

In 2002 whilst returning from Japan, Raymonde suffered a stroke, which affected his eyesight and his ability to concentrate, making it impossible for him to continue working. He died in 2009 after a fall at his home in Essex. He was survived by his wife Patricia, son Paul and daughter Kate.

References
 Roy Raymonde: Cartoonist noted for his work in 'Punch' and 'Playboy'
 British Cartoon Archive - University of Kent
 Roy Raymonde (England)
 Roy Raymonde - British Cartoonist - Punch, Playboy, Telegraph, Reader's Digest cartoons

External links
 Roy Raymonde Cartoonist

1929 births
2009 deaths
British cartoonists
People from Grantham
Playboy cartoonists
Punch (magazine) cartoonists